Rolf Bendiksen (born 12 April 1938 in Moskenes, Nordland) is a Norwegian politician of the Norwegian Labour Party (Ap). He was a representative in the Storting for Nordland from 1989.

He was a representative from 1985 – 1989.

Bendiksen was mayor of Moskenes from 1983–1987.

Stortings committees
1989–1993 in the sea and fisheries committee
1985–1989 in the sea and fisheries committee

External links

1938 births
Living people
Labour Party (Norway) politicians
Members of the Storting
20th-century Norwegian politicians
People from Moskenes